The Jiahou Line Bikeway is a cycleway in Taichung, Taiwan.

History
The cycleway was inaugurated on 15 July 2019 by the Tourism Office of Taichung City Government at Ciyao Levee of Waipu Lotus Valley. The ceremony was attended by Taichung Deputy Mayor and legislators from Taichung City Council.

Architecture
The cycleway spans over a total length of 35.2 km, divided into the main line which stretches for 16.97 km called Jiajou Line and branch lines named Liufen Road (5.63 km) and Lotus Valley (12.6 km). It connects Dajia District and Houli District in the city, with its branch connects with Waipu District.

Finance
The total construction cost of the cycleway was NT$24.58 million. Sports Administration subsidized 60% of the cycleway construction cost.

Facilities
The cycleway features two observation decks located at Ciyao Levee.

See also
 List of cycleways
 Taiwan Cycling Route No.1

References

2019 establishments in Taiwan
Cycleways in Taiwan
Tourist attractions in Taichung
Transport infrastructure completed in 2019
Transportation in Taichung